Sinfonietta op. 52 is a small symphony for string orchestra by Albert Roussel composed in 1934. It  was written at the same time as his fourth symphony. The first movement is a sonata-form.

Analysis 

 Allegro molto
 Andante
 Allegro

The work typically lasts eight minutes.

Discography 

 L'Orchestre de Chambre de la Sarre dirigé par Karl Ristenpart, 1955 (Les Discophiles Français , Grand prix du disque 1956)
 L'Orchestre de la Société des Concerts du Conservatoire dirigé par André Cluytens (EMI) ;
 L'Orchestre national royal d'Écosse dirigé par Stéphane Denève, 2007 (Naxos)

References 

Compositions by Albert Roussel
1923 compositions